Asprenas is a genus of Australasian stick insects belonging to the tribe Eurycanthini.

Species:

Asprenas brunneri 
Asprenas crassipes 
Asprenas dubius 
Asprenas effeminatus 
Asprenas femoratus 
Asprenas gracilipes 
Asprenas impennis 
Asprenas sarasini 
Asprenas spiniventris

References

Phasmatodea genera
Lonchodidae